Covert Action Division (CAD) is generally considered the most secretive special operations force of Pakistan. It is responsible for special paramilitary and covert operations. It is tasked to collect intelligence in dense hostile environments and act as a special warfare unit of the Inter-Services Intelligence (ISI). It is similar in function to the CIA Special Activities Center Special Operations Group.

History and formation 
After the formation of ISI in 1948, Pakistan faced a challenge in the Tribal Agencies of Waziristan caused by Faqir of Ipi. In response, a group of die-hard persons from the militia and Gilgit scouts were trained. They formed the new directorate of ISI. Their main task was to counter the influence of Faqir of Ipi and to delay any Afghan incursion until the main force of the Pakistan Army arrives. 

Until November 1954, the CAD was mostly aimed to counter insurgency in Waziristan but after that, its role was slowly expanded, and a new unit was raised in East Pakistan to assist insurgents in India's North-East. Its role was expanded in the late 1980s to assist the Khalistan Movement, headed by Jagjit Singh Chauhan. 

During the 1960s, the West only knew them by name but the unit then received training from CIA in the 1980s to assist the Afghan Mujahideen after the Soviet invasion. The unit also took part in many battles against Soviets.

Little is known about unit as it is one of the most classified elements of the Pakistan Defense establishment, working with a limited number of senior officers.

There were allegations that CAD teams were involved in training anti-Indian terrorists from the Pakistani side of Kashmir.

Training 
CAD operatives are trained in home developed tactics. They are also trained to a high level of proficiency in the tactical employment of an unusually wide degree of modern weaponry, improvised explosive devices, irregular warfare tactics, explosive devices and firearms (foreign and domestic), hand-to-hand combat, high performance/tactical driving (on and off-road), apprehension avoidance (including picking handcuffs and escaping from confinement), cyber warfare, covert channels, parachuting, SCUBA diving, proficiency in foreign languages, surreptitious entry operations (picking or otherwise bypassing locks), vehicle hot-wiring, Survival, Evasion, Resistance and Escape, extreme survival and wilderness training, combat EMS medical training, tactical communications, and tracking.

References

Inter-Services Intelligence
Military special forces of Pakistan